Ault Foods Limited was a Toronto-based dairy processor and Canada's largest dairy company acquiring other dairy companies across Canada. The company was established around 1926. Ault sold off parts of their business in the mid-1990s; milk division (Sealtest Dairy and Silverwood Dairy) was sold to Agropur. Ault itself was acquired by Parmalat in 1997 and the name ceased to exist.

Operations

Ault had 15 processing plants and 30 outlying distribution depots:

Some processing facilities included:
 Winchester, Ontario
 Don Mills, Ontario
 Ottawa, Ontario
 Orleans, Ontario
Main distribution centres consists of:

 Markham, Ontario
 Longueuil, Quebec
 Chilliwack, British Columbia

Brands

A list of products sold by Ault:

 Haagen-Dazs
 Sealtest milk in Canada
 Drumstick 
 Orco

See also

 Parmalat Canada
 Beatrice Foods Canada
 Sealtest Dairy
 Silverwood Dairy
Nestlé
Parlour

References

External

 http://www.eap.mcgill.ca/MagRack/RH/RH_E_97_05.htm
 Ault Foods

Companies based in Toronto
Dairy products companies of Canada
Lactalis
Companies disestablished in 1997
Defunct companies of Ontario
1926 establishments in Ontario
1997 mergers and acquisitions